The 2023 Norwegian First Division (referred to as OBOS-ligaen for sponsorship reasons) will be a Norwegian second-tier football league season.

The season is set to start on 10 April 2023 and end on 12 November 2023, not including play-off matches.

Teams 

In the 2022 Norwegian First Division, Brann and Stabæk were promoted to the 2023 Eliteserien, while Grorud and Stjørdals-Blink were relegated to the 2023 Norwegian Second Division.

Jerv and Kristiansund were relegated from the 2022 Eliteserien, while Moss and Hødd were promoted from the 2022 Norwegian Second Division.

Stadiums and locations

League table

Results

Play-offs

Promotion play-offs 

The teams from third to sixth place will take part in the promotion play-offs; these are single leg knockout matches. In the first round, the fifth-placed team will play at home against the sixth-placed team. The winner of the first round will meet the fourth-placed team on away ground in the second round. The winner of the second round will meet the third-placed team on away ground. The winner of the third round will face the 14th-placed team in the Eliteserien over two legs in the Eliteserien play-offs for a spot in the top-flight next season.

Relegation play-offs 
The 14th-placed team will take part in a two-legged play-off against the winners of the Second Division play-offs, to decide who will play in the First Division next season.

References 

Norwegian First Division seasons
2
Norway
Norway